Corallocarpus is a genus of succulent plants in the family Cucurbitaceae.

References

External links 
 
 

Cucurbitoideae
Cucurbitaceae genera
Taxa named by Joseph Dalton Hooker